Michael F. Kane (born June 10, 1967 in Holyoke, Massachusetts) is an American politician who represented the 5th Hampden District in the Massachusetts House of Representatives and was a Holyoke City Councilor from 1996–2000. Kane resigned his seat on June 11, 2012 to take a job at Columbia Gas. City Councilor Aaron Vega, a Democrat, won the election to succeed him during the general election on November 6, 2012.

References

1967 births
Politicians from Holyoke, Massachusetts
American International College alumni
Living people
Democratic Party members of the Massachusetts House of Representatives
Holyoke Community College alumni